The Hawaiian coot (Fulica alai), also known as the 'alae ke'oke'o in Hawaiian, is a bird in the rail family, Rallidae, that is endemic to Hawaii. In Hawaiian, alae is a noun and means mud hen. Kea or its synonym keo is an adjective for white. It has black plumage and a prominent white frontal shield. Its natural habitats are freshwater lakes, freshwater marshes, coastal saline lagoons, and water storage areas. The bird was federally listed in October 1970 as an endangered species  and is considered both endemic and endangered by the state of Hawaii. It is threatened by habitat loss and introduced predators such as the small Asian mongoose. The Makalawena Marsh on the Big Island of Hawaii has been listed as a National Natural Landmark to preserve one of its last nesting areas.

Endangered Species Listing
The Hawaiian coot was federally listed in October 1970 as an endangered species  and is considered both endemic and endangered by the state of Hawaii. The United States Fish and Wildlife Service's 5-year review, conducted in 2010, found that none of the four criteria established for delisting or downlisting of the species had been meet. The delisting/downlisting criteria include protection and management of core and supporting wetlands, a population size greater than 2000 birds for five consecutive years, and multiple self-sustaining populations throughout the Hawaiian Islands.

Taxonomy
The first reference to a coot in the Hawaiian Islands was by Andrew Bloxam, who encountered the Hawaiian coot but failed to collect a specimen as he mistook it for the Eurasian coot, Fulica atra, while in the islands in 1825 as the naturalist on board . It is now considered either to be a separate species, Fulica alai, or a subspecies of the American coot, Fulica americana alai.

Population size 
On Oahu, Maui, Molokai and Kaua’i, the Hawaiian coot was previously abundant in coastal brackish and fresh-water ponds, streams, and marshes; however, the first censuses conducted in the 1950s and 1960s detected fewer than 1,000 birds statewide. Since the 1960s, the interannual population size has fluctuated from less than 1,000 birds to over 3,000, and appears to be gradually increasing. Biannual surveys conducted by the Hawaiian Department of Land and Natural Resource's Division of Forestry and Wildlife (DOFAW) found that between 1998 and 2003 the inter-island coot population averaged 2,100 birds, ranging between 1,500 and 3,000 birds. Recent surveys estimated winter populations fluctuating around 1,500 birds and a summer population fluctuating around 2,000 birds.

Gallery

References

External links

BirdLife Species Factsheet.

Hawaiian coot
Endemic birds of Hawaii
Hawaiian coot
Taxonomy articles created by Polbot
ESA endangered species
Taxa named by Titian Peale